I'm Glad You're Here with Me Tonight is the eleventh studio album by Neil Diamond, released on Columbia Records in 1977. It includes a solo version of the song "You Don't Bring Me Flowers". Diamond would score a #1 hit with a new version recorded as a duet with Barbra Streisand the following year.

I'm Glad You're Here With Me Tonight was the second Neil Diamond album in a row to also garner a television special, which was broadcast on November 17, 1977, over the NBC television network. The television special received a Directors Guild of America award for Outstanding Directorial Achievement in Musical/Variety for Director Art Fisher, Associate Director David Grossman and Stage Manager Bob Graner. It was also nominated for three Emmy Awards. The special was a thematic and "behind the scenes" based program with interspersed live performances. It also features a pioneering segment with one of the earliest broadcasts of what would come to be known as a music video with its treatment of Diamond's song "Morningside".

Track listing

Personnel

Neil Diamond's Band
Neil Diamond – main performer, writer, vocals, guitar
Tom Hensley – orchestra arranger and conductor on "Dance of the Sabres", piano, keyboards
Alan Lindgren – synthesizer, piano
Linda Press – backing vocals
Marilyn O'Brien – backing vocals
Richard Bennett – acoustic and electric guitars
Emory Gordy Jr. – guitar, keyboards
Doug Rhone – guitar
Reinie Press – bass guitar
Dennis St. John – drums
Vince Charles and King Errisson – percussion

Orchestra and guest musicians
Alan Lindgren – orchestra arranger and conductor on all tracks except "Dance of the Sabres"
The Sid Sharp Strings – strings
Murray Adler, Arnold Belnick, Al Bruening, Sal Crimi, Isabelle Daskoff, Henry Ferber, Elliott Fisher, Ronald Folsom, Jimmy Getzoff, Meg Grabb, Lou Klass, Bernie Kundell, Bill Kurasch, Marvin Lamonick, Joy Lyle, Gordon Marin, Stan Plummer, Jay Rosen, Nate Ross, Sheldon Sanov, Marcia Van Dyke, and Tibor Zelig – violin
Sam Boghossian, Richard Dickler, Pam Goldsmith, Alan Harshman, Myra Kestenbaum, Linda Lipsett, Mike Nowak, Dave Schwartz, Linn Subotnick, Herschel Weiss – viola
Jesse Erlich, Armin Kaproff, Ray Kelly, Jerry Kessler, Harry Schultz, Gloria Strasner – cello
Peter Mercurio, Buell Neidlinger, Bob Stone – double bass
Gayle Levant – harp
Bobby and Chuck Findley, Jack Laubach, Bobby Shew, Tony Terran – trumpet
Charlie Loper, Bob Payne – trombone
Ernie Tack – bass trombone
Tommy Johnson – tuba
Tom Scott – horn soloist
Alan and Marnie Robinson – French horn
Harold Diner, James A. Dseker, Bob Hardaway, Terry Harrington, Dick Hyde, Barbara Korn, Steven P. Madaio, Arthur N. Maebe, Lew McCreary, Oliver E. Mitchell, Brian Dennis O'Conner, William R. Perkins, Johnny Rotella, George B. Thatcher – reeds
Tommy Morgan – harmonica

Production
Bob Gaudio – producer
David Kirschner – art direction, design
Bill Schnee – audio engineering on basic tracks, vocals, strings, horns
Chris Brunt – audio engineering on vocals and miscellaneous
Mike Reese and Doug Sax – mastering
Val Garay – remixing
Jerry Barnes – horns tracking
Mallory Earl and Dennis Kirk – overdubs and miscellaneous tracking
Marge Johnson – production coordinator
Beatrice Marks – producer's assistant
Dennis Hansen and Neil Kernan – audio engineering assistants
Tom Bert – photography
Bob Maile – calligraphy

Charts

Weekly charts

Year-end charts

Certifications

References

External links

1977 albums
Neil Diamond albums
Columbia Records albums
Albums produced by Bob Gaudio